Isaac Wright may refer to:

Isaac Wright (investor) (1760–1832), American investor
Isaac Wright Jr. (born 1962), American lawyer
Isaac Hempstead Wright (born 1999), British actor